can refer to the following places in Japan:

 Furano, Hokkaidō, a city in Hokkaidō 
 Furano Ski Resort, a major alpine ski area near the city of Furano
 Mount Furano, a mountain in the Tokachi Volcanic Group of Hokkaidō